Ghazi Hanania is a Christian member of the Palestinian Legislative Council.  He is a member of Fatah.

Dr. Hanania was elected as the deputy speaker of the first Palestinian Legislative Council. 

Born in Ramallah on August 3, 1945 to a Christian family, Ghazi attended Al-
Al Ahliya School in Ramallah and the Coptic School in Jerusalem (Palestine).

Chairman of board of The Palestinian Center for Development and Media Freedom.

Dr. Hanania was the chairman of the board of the Sheikh Zayed trauma center in Ramallah, 
He inaugurated the Abu Raya Rehab Center in Ramallah, Palestine.

Ghazi has been a member of Palestinian Health Council and the Union of Ramallah People since 1992 and Chairman of the Board of the Union of Ramallah People since 1994.

Dr. Hanaia is a member of the board of many business and cooperations in Palestine.

External links
article which includes a speech by him and his photograph
Biography A biography by the 'Palestinian Academic Society for the Study of International Affairs'

1945 births
Living people
People from Ramallah
Members of the 1996 Palestinian Legislative Council
Fatah members